The 2009 season was Buffalo Flash's first season of existence, and the first in which they competed in the W-League, at the time the second division of women's soccer in the United States.

Club

Current roster

Team management

Match results

Playoffs

Standings

Great Lakes Division

See also 
 2009 W-League season

References 

2009
Buffalo Flash
Buffalo Flash